Shakheh-ye Albu Shahbaz (also Romanized as Shākheh-ye Ālbū Shahbāz; also known as Shākheh-ye Pā’īn) is a village in Jaffal Rural District, in the Central District of Shadegan County, Khuzestan Province, Iran. At the 2006 census, its population was 135, in 28 families.

References 

Populated places in Shadegan County